Noe is a surname in various European countries originating from the given name Noah, as well as a rare Korean surname meaning "thunder".

Origins
As a Dutch, English, French, and German surname, Noe is derived from the biblical given name Noah (Middle English and Latin ). Other surnames with the same derivation include the English variant Noy, as well as Noa and Nohe. The spelling Noè usually originates from the Italian form of the given name Noah, while the spelling Noé usually originates from the French form, but in many cases, descendants in other countries have dropped the diacritics. Occasionally, the ancestors of some modern-day bearers of the surname had instead derived it from the given name Noël, or as a toponymic surname from Noé, Haute-Garonne, France. Noah was not a common given name in medieval England when the surname first appeared there, and so Patrick Hanks suggests that the surname may have been used by descendants of people who were nicknamed Noah, for example as a jocular reference to the Genesis flood narrative, or because they had played the part of Noah in a stage play. 

As a Korean surname, Noe can be written with either of two hanja characters: one meaning "thunder", and the other meaning "to request". In North Korea, both of these surnames are still spelled Roe, but in South Korea, the spelling of Sino-Korean words starting with 'r' has changed. The first character is used to write the Chinese surname now pronounced Léi in Mandarin Chinese, while the second is used to write the surname Lài. In Korea, surnames are also divided by identification with bon-gwan, which are hometowns of a clan lineage. However, in the 1930 colonial census, most of the households with the surname Noe resided in Hwanghae Province (34 households), with the remaining six households being in South Pyongan (5) and Chungcheongnamdo (1). Its members claim descent from Noe I-seong, who came from China to Korea to take the official post of  during the reign of Emperor Dezong of Qing in the late 19th century.

Statistics
In Italy, 426 families bore the surname Noe, with 197 (46.2%) located in Lombardy, 49 (11.5%) in Piedmont, and 42 (9.9%) in Veneto.

In the Netherlands, there were 184 people with the surname Noë as of 2007, up from 175 in 1947.

In South Korea, the 2000 census found 80 people in 26 households with the surname Noe meaning "thunder", all but two of whom identified with the Gyodong bon-gwan. There were also 12 people in two households with the surname Noe meaning "to request", but the census did not record their bon-gwan. Statistics for the current distribution of these surnames in North Korea are not available. A 1930 taxation survey by the Japanese colonial government found roughly thirty households with the surname meaning "thunder", primarily in Suan County and Hwangju County, North Hwanghae province (in an area that became part of North Korea after the division of Korea).

The 2010 United States Census found 11,182 people with the surname Noe, making it the 3,229th-most-common name in the country. This represented an increase in absolute numbers, but a decrease in relative proportion, from 10,789 (3,080th-most-common) in the 2000 Census. In both censuses, more than 90% of the bearers of the surname identified as White, between three and five per cent as Hispanic, and between one and two percent as Asian.

People

Humanities
 Yvan Noé (1895–1963), French playwright
 Kenneth W. Noe (born 1957), American historian
 Alva Noë (born 1964), American philosophy professor
 Ian Noe (born 1990), American musician
 Katherine Schlick Noe, American education professor
 Mary Noe, American educator, writer and lecturer
 Constantin Noe (1883–1939), Megleno-Romanian editor and professor

Politics
 José de Jesús Noé (1805–1862), the last Mexican alcalde of Yerba Buena, now San Francisco
 Giovanni Noè (1866–1908), Italian lawyer, anarchist, and politician
 James A. Noe (1890–1976), American politician from Louisiana
 Cindy Noe (born 1947), American politician from Indiana
 Thomas Noe (born 1954), American politician from Ohio

Science and medicine
 Friedrich Wilhelm Noë (1798–1858), German-born Austrian pharmacist
 Adolf Carl Noé (1873–1939), Austrian-born palaeobotanist
 Jerre Noe (1923–2005), American computer scientist
 Joel Mark Noe (1943–1991), American plastic surgeon

Sport
 Chuck Noe (1924–2003), American basketball coach
 Chet Noe (born 1931), American basketball player
 Anne Noë (born 1959), Belgian football coach
 Marc Noë (born 1962), Belgian footballer and later manager
 Ángel Noé Alayón (born 1964), Colombian cyclist
 Andrea Noè (born 1969), Italian road bicycle racer
 Jacob Noe (born 1980), American mixed martial artist
 Guilherme Noé (1992–2021), Brazilian footballer
 Bálint Noé (born 1993), Hungarian canoeist

Visual arts
 Amédée de Noé (1818–1879), French caricaturist and lithographer
 Luis Felipe Noé (born 1933), Argentine artist and writer
 Gaspar Noé (born 1963), Argentine filmmaker
 Ignacio Noé (born 1965), Argentine graphic artist
 Rémy Noë (born 1974), British painter

Other
 Sydney P. Noe (1885–1969), American numismatist
 Ana María Noé (1914–1970), Spanish actress
 Virgilio Noè (1922–2011), Italian Catholic prelate
 Marie Noe (born 1928), American woman convicted of murdering eight of her children
 Clifford Noe (1930–2004), American conman
  (1938–2008), German economist
 Arvid Noe (1946–1976), pseudonym of a Norwegian man who died due to AIDS
 Leo Noe (born 1953), British real estate investor
 Kevin Noe (born 1969), American conductor and stage director
 Tankeu Noé (?–1964), Cameroonian guerrilla

References

Dutch-language surnames
English-language surnames
French-language surnames
German-language surnames
Korean-language surnames
Megleno-Romanian-language surnames